Spartak Sofia is an ice hockey team in Sofia, Bulgaria. They were founded in 1956. The club merged with Levski Sofia in 1969, forming Levski-Spartak Sofia. Levski broke off in 1993, and Spartak was dissolved. In 2007, Spartak was revived, and played in the Bulgarian Hockey League during the 2007-08 and 2008-09 seasons.

External links
Club profile on eurohockey.net

1956 establishments in Bulgaria
1993 disestablishments in Bulgaria
2007 establishments in Bulgaria
Bulgarian Hockey League teams
Ice hockey clubs established in 1956
Ice hockey clubs established in 2007
Ice hockey teams in Bulgaria
Sport in Sofia
Sports clubs disestablished in 1993